The history of photography in Japan begins in the 19th century and has continued to be a prominent art form into the present era.

19th-century

Importation of photography

In 1848 (Edo era), a camera for daguerréotype was imported by a Dutch ship to Japan (Nagasaki, 長崎).  It is said that this was the first camera in Japan.  During Edo era, the import and the export had been prohibited (sakoku, 鎖国) by the Edo Government (Edobakufu, 江戸幕府), except that only Dutch ships had been permitted to export and import various goods at Nagasaki Port.  Therefore, the first camera was introduced at Nagasaki.  This camera was imported by Ueno Toshinojō (1790–1851, 上野俊之丞) and in 1849 passed to Shimazu Nariakira (1809–1858, 島津斉彬), who later would become a feudal lord (daimyō, 大名) of Satsuma Domain (薩摩藩, now Kagoshima-ken). 

In Satsuma Domain, detailed study with respect to photography had been done, but it took almost ten years from the acquisition of the first camera to taking the first photograph.  In 1857, SHIMAZU Nariakira's photograph was taken by Ichiki Shirō (1828–1903, 市来四郎) and UJUKU Hikoemon (宇宿彦右衛門) (daguerréotype).  This is said to be the first photograph taken by Japanese and still exist and can be seen at Shōko Shūseikan (尚古集成館, Kagoshima-city, Japan).

In 1854, Convention of Kanagawa (日米和親条約, Nichi-Bei Washin Jōyaku, "America-Japan Treaty of Amity and Friendship") was concluded between U.S. and Japan, Anglo-Japanese Friendship Treaty (日英和親条約, Nichi-Ei Washin Jōyaku) was concluded between Britain and Japan, and Treaty of Shimoda (日露和親条約, Nichi-Ro Washin Jōyaku) was concluded between Russia and Japan.  The treaties opened the Japanese ports of Shimoda (in Shizuoka Prefecture), Hakodate (in Hokkaido Prefecture) and Nagasaki to the trade.  In 1858, Treaty of Amity and Commerce (United States – Japan) (日米修好通商条約).was concluded between U.S. and Japan and opened the port of Kanagawa, but soon the port of Yokohama (横浜), which is close to Kanagawa, opened for the trade with foreign countries in exchange to the port of Kanagawa.  The trade based on these treaties began in 1858 at Yokohama, Nagasaki and Hakodate.  This is called Kaikoku (開国, to open the nation for foreign countries and trades) in Japanese language.  Thanks to Kaikoku, more and more cameras and other photography-related equipment and materials had been imported to Japan.  Further some foreign photographers, such as Felix Beato came to Japan and took many photographs of Japan. 

In 1862, Ueno Hikoma (1838–1904, 上野彦馬) opened his photo studio in Nagasaki and Shimooka Renjo (1823–1914, 下岡蓮杖) opened his photo studio in Noge (野毛, soon later included within Yokohama), in the same year, but independently. The open of these two photo studios for portraits indicated the new era of Japanese photography.

Professional photographers in the Meiji era

After the opening of Ueno Studio and Shimooka Studio, around the turning point between Edo Era and Meiji Era (1868), several new photo studios were opened, such as that of Kuichi Uchida (1844–1875, 内田九一) in 1865 in Osaka and in 1866 moved to Yokohama, that of Yohei Hori (or HORI Masumi, 1826–1880, 堀与兵衛 (堀真澄)) in 1865 in Kyoto, that of Kōkichi Kizu (1830–1895, 木津幸吉) in 1866 in Hakodate, that of Rihei Tomishige (1837–1922, 冨重利平) in Yanagawa, Chikugo in 1866 and that of Yokoyama Matsusaburō (1838–1884, 横山松三郎).

Among these photographers (Shashin-shi, 写真師), Uchida Kuichi is most famous for his photographs of Meiji Emperor (明治天皇) in 1872 and 1873, which photographs have been called Goshin'ei (御真影) and were used as public portraits of Meiji Emperor.  "真(shin)" means "true" and "影(ei)" means "(photographic) image" or "portrait" and "御(go)" means honorific prefix for "真影".  In Meiji Era, only very limited persons, such as prime ministers, could meet Meiji Emperor in person and most Japanese people in Meiji Era had no chance to see Meiji Emperor.  But Meiji Emperor's image was necessary for him to govern Japan and Japanese nations.  Therefore, Meiji Government prepared "御真影" and used "御真影" for Emperor's governance and Meiji Government's governance.

As other photographers, Kakoku Shima (1827–1870島霞谷) and Ryū Shima (1823–1899,  島隆) should be mentioned. They were a husband and a wife and began taking photography together around 1863 or 1864, and Ryū Shima was called the first woman professional photographer.

Further, around the 1860s and 1900, Yokohama-shashin (Yokohama Photo, Photographs selling or distributing in Yokohama, 横浜写真) was very popular.  Yokohama-shashin was a photograph of Japanese scenery, Japanese people (especially Japanese women) and Japanese cultures and a very widely used souvenir especially for foreign people.  Among photographers for Yokohama-shashin, Felix Beato and Kusakabe Kimbei (1841–1934, 日下部金兵衛) were very famous.

Because of Kaikoku, many foreign people came to Japan.  Further, after Meiji Ishin (Meiji Government was established in 1868), many Japanese were able to travel within Japan without breaking laws and began to travel within Japan.  Yokohama was a suitable place to visit both for foreign people and Japanese people, and Yokohama-shashin attracted such travellers very much.

Two main characteristics of Yokohama-shashin were;
a well-decorated album-style photographs, and
hand-colored photographs.

But towards the end of the 19th century, picture post cards, which were much cheaper than Yokohama-shashin, became very popular and were widely used in Japan, and many amateur photographers were emerging, who liked to take pictures by themselves than to buy expensive Yokohama-shashin.  These were the major reasons for Yokohama-shashin to decline.

In the 1880s, photographers in a new generation and new types began their activities.  Reiji Esaki (1845–1910, 江崎礼二), who took photographs of experimental torpedo explosion in Sumida river in 1883, and Kazuma Ogawa (1860–1929, 小川一眞), who not only took photographs but also was the managers of a printing factory, were particularly famous among them.

In the 1860s and 1870s, many photographs of Hokkaidō were taken, which photographs are called Hokkaidō Kaitaku Shashin (Photographs of Developments in Hokkaidō, 北海道開拓写真).  In the 1860s and 1870s, Hokkaidō was under the development by the Japanese Government.  The Government in Tokyo needed detailed reports of the development in writing, and they thought reports with photographs should be better and the Government requested some photographers to take photographs of the development in Hokkaidō.  Such photographers included Tamoto Kenzō (1832–1912, 田本研造), Kōkichi Ida (1846–1911, 井田侾吉), Raimund von Stillfried-Ratenicz (1839–1911), Seiichi Takebayashi (1842–1908, 武林盛一) and Sakuma Hanzō (1844–1897, 佐久間範造).

Emerging amateur photographers
Around the middle of the 1880s, photographers (写真師) began to use gelatin dry plates very widely.  Before the spread of gelatin dry plates, the wet collodion process (湿式コロジオン法) was ordinary process for photography in Japan and to use this process was very difficult in technical points and also it costs a considerable sum of money.  It means almost no amateur photographers can exist without gelatin dry plates.

Two famous examples of earliest amateur photographers in Japan were as follows;
Kamei Koreaki (1861–1896, 亀井茲明), who was a count and studied aesthetics in England and Germany, took photographs of the Sino-Japanese War (日清戦争) in 1895.
Kajima Seibei (1866–1924, 鹿島清兵衛) took many photographs in the 1890s, such as a life-size portrait of Manzaburō Umewaka (NO (能) actor) and a big-size photograph of Mt. Fuji.

Wide spread of gelatin dry plates and small-sized cameras led to the era of prominent amateur photographers in the 20th century in Japan.

Other major photographers
HASEGAWA Kichijirō (fl. 1870s, 長谷川吉次郎) who is included in "The History of Japanese Photography" (About this source, please refer to "Further reading" below)

20th century

Era of Geijutsushashin (Era of Pictorialism) 
In 1904, Yūtsuzu-sha (ゆふつヾ社) was founded by Tetsusuke Akiyama, Seiichi Katō and other photographers.
In 1904, Naniwa Photography Club (Naniwa Shashin Club, 浪華写真倶楽部) was founded in Osaka.
In 1907, Tokyo Photographic Research Society (Tokyo Shashin Kenkyūkai, 東京写真研究会) was founded in Tokyo.
In 1912, Aiyū Photography Club (Aiyū Shashin Club, 愛友写真倶楽部) was founded in Nagoya and Chotaro Hidaka (1883–1926, 日高長太郎), Aitarō Masuko (1882–1968, 益子愛太郎) and Matsutaro Ohashi (1891–1941, 大橋松太郎) actively made photographs as a member of this Club.
In 1912, Yonin Kai was founded by Yasuzō Nojima (1889–1964, 野島康三) and other three photographers.
In 1921, Shashin Geijutsu Sha (写真芸術社) was founded and the first issue of Shashin Geijutsu (Photographic Art, 写真芸術) was published by Shinzō Fukuhara (1883–1948, 福原信三), Rosō Fukuhara (1892–1946, 福原路草) and other photographers.
In 1922, Japan Photographic Art Association (Nihon Kōga Geijutsu Kyōkai, 日本光画芸術協会) was founded by Hakuyō Fuchikami (1889–1960, 淵上白陽) and the first issue of Hakuyō (白陽) was published.
In 1922, the first issue of Geijutsu Shashin Kenkyū (Art Photography Studies, 芸術写真研究) was published.
In 1922, a photographic monograph Paris et la Seine, Paris and the Seine (Pari to Seinu, 巴里とセイヌ) and in 1923, another monograph, Light and its Euphony (Hikari to sone Kaichō, 光と其諧調) were published by Shinzō Fukuhara.
In the early 1920s, ves-tan school (ベス単派) was formed by Masataka Takayama (1895–1981, 高山正隆), Makihiko Yamamoto (1893–1985, 山本牧彦) and Jun Watanabe.

Era of Shinkōshashin (Era of New Photography) 

In the early and mid-1920s, there appeared some photographic tendencies called constructivism school (構成派) within Nihon Kōga Geijutsu Kyōkai members, for example, in Hakuyō Fuchikami's works.
In 1923, the first issue of Asahi Graph (The Asahigraph Weekly, アサヒグラフ) was published.
In 1923, there occurred Kantō Great Earthquake (Kantō Daishinsai, 関東大震災).
In 1924, the first issue of Photo Times (フォトタイムス) was published.
In 1926, the first issue of Asahi Camera (アサヒカメラ) was published.
In 1927, Iwata Nakayama returned to Japan after several years in the U.S. and Europe,
In 1930, Tampei Photography Club (Tampei Shashin Club) (February 1930-c. 1941, Osaka) (丹平写真倶楽部) was founded by Bizan Ueda and other photographers and later Nakaji Yasui (1903–1942, 安井仲治) entered this Club.
In 1930, Ashiya Camera Club (芦屋カメラクラブ) was founded by Iwata Nakayama (1895–1949, 中山岩太), Kambei Hanaya (1903–1991, ハナヤ勘兵衛) and other photographers.
In 1930, New Photography Research Society (Shinko Shashin Kenkyūkai, 新興写真研究会) was founded and the first issue of Shinko Shashin Kenkyū (New Photography Studies, 新興写真研究) was published by Sen'ichi Kimura.
1931: German International Traveling Photography Exhibition (独逸国際移動写真展, Doitsu Kokusai Idō Shashin Ten; This was a traveling exhibition of "Film und Foto" in Stuttgart, Germany in 1929) was held in Tokyo [April] and Osaka [July].
In 1932, the first issue of Kōga (Photography, 光画) was published by Yasuzō Nojima, Iwata Nakayama and Ihee Kimura (or Ihei Kimura).
In 1932, Manchuria Photographic Artists Association (Manshū Shashin Sakka Kyōkai) (満洲写真作家協会) was founded and in 1933, Manshū Graph (Pictorial Manchuria, 満洲グラフ) was published by Hakuyō Fuchikami.
In 1932, a photographic monograph, Camera, Eye x Iron, Construction (Camera, Me x Tetsu Kōsei, カメラ・眼×鉄・構成) was published by Masao Horino (1907–1999, 堀野正雄).
In 1933, a photographic monograph, Early Summer Nerves (Shoka Shinkei, 初夏神経) was published by Kiyoshi Koishi (1908–1957, 小石清).
In 1936, a photographic monograph, the Reason for Sleep (Nemuri no Riyū, 眠りの理由) was published by Ei-Q.
In 1937, Avant-Garde Image Group (Avant-Garde Zōei Shūdan, アヴァンギャルド造影集団) was founded by Gingo Hanawa (1894–1957, 花和銀吾), Terushichi Hirai (1900–1970, 平井輝七) and other photographers.
In 1938, Avant-Garde Photography Association (Zen'ei Shashin Kyōkai, 前衛写真協会) was founded by Shūzo Takiguchi and some photographers.
In 1939, Nagoya Photo Avant-Garde (名古屋フォトアバンガルド) was founded by  Minoru Sakata (1902–1974, 坂田稔), Kansuke Yamamoto (1914–1987, 山本悍右) and other photographers.
In 1939, Société Irf (ソシエテ・イルフ) was founded in Fukuoka by Wataru Takahashi (1900–1944, 高橋渡) and other photographers.
In 1940, a photographic monograph, Mesembryanthemum ("Mesem Zoku", メセム属) was published by Yoshio Shimozato.
In 1940, a photographic monograph, Light ("Hikari", 光) was published by Tampei Shashin Club.
In 1942, Nakaji Yasui died.

Era of Hōdōshashin (Era of Photojournalism) 
In 1932, Yōnosuke Natori returned to Japan from Germany as a correspondent photographer of Ullstein-Verlag.
In 1933, Nippon Kōbō (Japan Studio, 日本工房) was founded by Yōnosuke Natori, but in 1934 most of main members other than Natori has left Nippon Kobo and founded Chūō Kōbō (Metropolitan Studio, 中央工房). Then Natori reorganized Nippon Kōbō.
In 1934, the first issue of Nippon was published by Nippon Kōbō.
In 1938, the first issue of Shashin Shūhō (Photo Weekly, 写真週報) was published.
In 1941, Tōhōsha (Far East Company, 東方社) was founded.
In 1942, the first issue of Front was published by Tōhōsha.

After WWII, there appeared the era of Hōdōshashin (era of photojournalism) again, mainly led by Ken Domon (1909–1990, 土門拳), Ihee Kimura (Ihei Kimura, 1901–1974, 木村伊兵衛) and Yōnosuke Natori (1910–1962, 名取洋之助), all of three were very active even during WWII.  Avant-garde photography including surrealism and pictorialism photography had almost disappeared behind photojournalism after WWII because photography other than photojournalism which supported Japanese government and Japanese military powers was completely oppressed by the Japanese government during WWII. It took several years before avant-garde photography came back to the stage of the history of Japanese photography.

21st century

References

Further reading
The History of Japanese Photography, The Museum of Fine Arts, Houston, Yale University Press, 2003, 
Modern Photography in Japan 1915–1940, 2001, 

 
Photography
History of art in Japan